Molla Baqer (also Romanized as Mollā Bāqer and Mollā Bāger) is a village in Golian Rural District, in the Central District of Shirvan County, North Khorasan Province, Iran. At the 2006 census, its population was 704, in 187 families.

References 

Populated places in Shirvan County